William Alleyne Cecil, 3rd Marquess of Exeter PC (30 April 1825 – 14 July 1895), styled Lord Burghley between 1825 and 1867, was a British peer and Conservative politician. He served as Treasurer of the Household between 1866 and 1867 and as Captain of the Honourable Corps of Gentlemen-at-Arms between 1867 and 1868.

Background
Exeter was the eldest son of Brownlow Cecil, 2nd Marquess of Exeter, and his wife Isabella, daughter of William Stephen Poyntz, MP. He was educated at St. John's College, Cambridge, where he was president of the University Pitt Club.

Cricket
Exeter played first-class cricket for the Marylebone Cricket Club and Cambridge University between 1847 and 1851.

Political career
Exeter was elected to the House of Commons for South Lincolnshire in 1847, a seat he held until 1857, and then represented North Northamptonshire from 1857 to 1867. He served under the Earl of Derby as Treasurer of the Household from 1866 to 1867, when he succeeded his father in the marquessate and entered the House of Lords. In March 1867 Derby appointed him Captain of the Honourable Corps of Gentlemen-at-Arms, a post he held until December 1868, the last nine months under the premiership of Benjamin Disraeli. In 1866 he was admitted to the Privy Council.

Family
Lord Exeter married Lady Georgina Sophia Pakenham, daughter of Thomas Pakenham, 2nd Earl of Longford, on 17 October 1848. They had at least nine children:

Brownlow Henry George Cecil, Lord Burghley, later the 4th Marquess of Exeter (1849–1898)
Lord Francis Horace Pierrepont Cecil (1851–1889), married Edith Brookes, daughter of Sir William Cunliffe Brooks, 1st Baronet.
Lord William Cecil (1854–1943), married (1) Mary Tyssen-Amherst, Baroness Amherst, (2) Violet Freer.
Lady Catherine Sarah Cecil (1861–1918), married Henry de Vere Vane, 9th Baron Barnard.
Colonel Lord John Pakenham Joicey-Cecil (1867–1942)
Lady Isabella Georgiana Katherine Cecil (d. 1903), married William Battie-Wrightson.
Lady Mary Louisa Wellesley Cecil (d. 1930), married James Hozier, 2nd Baron Newlands.
Lady Louisa Alexandrina Cecil (d. 1950), died unmarried.
Lady Frances Emily Cecil (d. 1951), died unmarried.

Lord Exeter died in July 1895, aged 70, and was succeeded in his titles by his eldest son Brownlow, who also became a government minister. The Marchioness of Exeter died in March 1909. Lady Angela Forbes wrote in her 1919 memoir, Memories and Base Details, of how she "[stood] in wholesome dread, in company, I may say, with her own family" of the formidable Marchioness.  "Not to speak until you were spoken to, was a doctrine I did not at all appreciate, but one rigidly enforced at Burleigh! Prayers were read daily by Lady Exeter in the beautiful old chapel adjoining the house ... [on] one fatal occasion I giggled – and Lady Exeter stopped dead in the middle of a sentence, looking straight at me.  'When the wicked man turneth away from his wickedness' – and then there was a horrid pause.  No notice was taken as we went out, but a little later a message came that 'her ladyship would like to see me.'  My outward bravado was not in the least indicative of my feelings as I stood in front of her listening to a severe lecture couched in the most satirical language, whilst her two daughters stood, dragon-like, on either side of her."

References

External links 
 

1825 births
1895 deaths
Barons Burghley
Alumni of St John's College, Cambridge
William Cecil, 3rd Marquess of Exeter
Members of the Privy Council of the United Kingdom
Burghley, William Cecil, Lord
Burghley, William Cecil, Lord
Burghley, William Cecil, Lord
Burghley, William Cecil, Lord
Burghley, William Cecil, Lord
Burghley, William Cecil, Lord
Exeter, M3
Treasurers of the Household
Honourable Corps of Gentlemen at Arms
English cricketers
Cambridge University cricketers
Marylebone Cricket Club cricketers
English cricketers of 1826 to 1863
3
North v South cricketers